Juan Sordo Madaleno (October 1916, Mexico City – 12 March 1985, Idem) was a Mexican architect.

Biography 
Sordo Madaleno was one of the most important Mexican architects of his era. He worked with other renowned architects, including Luis Barragán, Jose Villagran Garcia, Augusto H. Álvarez, Ricardo Legorreta, Francisco J. Serrano and José Adolfo Wiechers.

Architecturally, he settled initially in the Bauhaus style and influence of Le Corbusier. He designed especially hotels and residential buildings.

In 1937, he founded his architectural firm, now known as the Sordo Madaleno Arquitectos SC.

Family
On 20 June 1941 he married Magdalena Bringas Aguado. Their children are: José Juan(1942–1974), Magdalena (born 1944) and Javier (born 1956).

Their son Javier Sordo Madaleno Bringas is also an architect and heads since 1982, the architectural firm. In 1963, he earned the Hacienda "La Laja" in Tequisquiapan in the Mexican state of Querétaro, where he successfully bred bulls and the family then lived.

Important work 
 1951 — Cine Ermita - Mexico City
 1954 — Cine París - Mexico City
 1958 — Contigo Tower (formerly named Torre Anáhuac) - Mexico City
 1959 — Hotel El Presidente - Acapulco
 1958 — Cabaret La Jacaranda del Hotel El Presidente (in collaboration with Félix Candela) - Acapulco
 1960 — Merck-Sharp & Dohme Factory - Mexico City
 1961 — María Isabel Hotel - Mexico City (in collaboration with José Villagrán García)
 1961 — San Ignacio de Loyola Church - Mexico City
 1962 — Cartuchos Deportivos de México (in collaboration with Félix Candela) - Cuernavaca
 1964 — Palacio de Justicia - Mexico City (in collaboration with José Adolfo Wiechers)
 1969 — Plaza Universidad - Mexico City
 1969 — El Presidente Hotel - Cozumel
 1971 — Plaza Satélite - Ciudad Satélite, Naucalpan
 1974 — El Presidente Hotel - Cancun,
 1975 — Palmas 555 - Mexico City
 1976 — Centro Corporativo Bancomer - Mexico City
 1977 — Hotel Presidente InterContinental - Mexico City
 1980 — Perisur - Mexico City

See also
Modernist architecture in Mexico

References

External links 
 
 Praella.com:  Bilder der Werke von Juan Sordo Madaleno

Modernist architects from Mexico
International style architects
1916 births
1985 deaths
Architects from Mexico City
Sordo Madaleno
20th-century Mexican architects